This is a list of school districts in Texas, sorted by Region and County.

Geographical school districts in Texas are (with one exception, the Stafford Municipal School District) completely independent from city or county jurisdiction.

Texas school district boundaries are not always aligned with county or city boundaries; a district can occupy several counties and cities, while a single city (especially larger ones such as Dallas, Houston, or San Antonio) may be split between several districts.

Almost all Texas school districts use the title "Independent School District", or ISD. Except for Stafford, those few districts that do not have "ISD" in their names are nonetheless ISDs.

This list does not include:
Juvenile prison schools run by the Texas Juvenile Justice Department (formerly by the Texas Youth Commission)
Schools and school systems without campuses or local taxing districts, such as the Texas Tech University Independent School District
Public charter schools

It does include Independent School Districts run by orphanages or homes for troubled children. However, there are only three known examples, the Masonic Home Independent School District (which closed in 2005 and is listed with the other defunct school districts below the main list), the Boles Independent School District (which later expanded to serve homes in the nearby area; the organization now also serves troubled children who are not orphaned), and the Boys Ranch Independent School District (which only serves troubled children who are residents; despite its name it serves both boys and girls).

All districts come under the jurisdiction of the Texas Education Agency (TEA).  Extracurricular activities involving competitions between schools typically come under the jurisdiction of the University Interscholastic League (UIL), which is not part of TEA.

Region 1

Brooks County
 Brooks County Independent School District

Cameron County

 Brownsville Independent School District
 Harlingen Consolidated Independent School District
 La Feria Independent School District
 Los Fresnos Consolidated Independent School District
 Point Isabel Independent School District
 Rio Hondo Independent School District
 San Benito Consolidated Independent School District
 Santa Maria Independent School District
 Santa Rosa Independent School District
 South Texas Independent School District (also extends into Hidalgo and Willacy Counties)

Hidalgo County

 Donna Independent School District
 Edcouch-Elsa Independent School District
 Edinburg Consolidated Independent School District
 Hidalgo Independent School District
 La Joya Independent School District
 La Villa Independent School District
 McAllen Independent School District
 Mercedes Independent School District
 Mission Consolidated Independent School District
 Monte Alto Independent School District
 Pharr-San Juan-Alamo Independent School District
 Progreso Independent School District
 Sharyland Independent School District
 Valley View Independent School District
 Weslaco Independent School District

Jim Hogg County
 Jim Hogg County Independent School District

Starr County

 Rio Grande City Consolidated Independent School District
 Roma Independent School District
 San Isidro Independent School District

Webb County

 Laredo Independent School District
 United Independent School District
 Webb Consolidated Independent School District

Willacy County

 Lasara Independent School District
 Lyford Consolidated Independent School District (also extends into Cameron and Hidalgo Counties)
 Raymondville Independent School District
 San Perlita Independent School District

Zapata County
 Zapata County Independent School District

Region 2

Aransas County
 Aransas County Independent School District

Bee County

 Beeville Independent School District
 Pawnee Independent School District (also extends into Karnes County)
 Pettus Independent School District (also extends into Karnes County)
 Skidmore-Tynan Independent School District (also extends into San Patricio County)

Duval County

 Benavides Independent School District
 Freer Independent School District
 Ramirez Common School District
 San Diego Independent School District (also extends into Jim Wells County)

Jim Wells County

 Alice Independent School District
 Ben Bolt-Palito Blanco Independent School District
 La Gloria Independent School District
 Orange Grove Independent School District
 Premont Independent School District (also extends into Duval County)

Kenedy County
 Kenedy County Wide Common School District

Kleberg County

 Kingsville Independent School District
 Ricardo Independent School District
 Riviera Independent School District (also extends into Kenedy County)
 Santa Gertrudis Independent School District

Live Oak County

 George West Independent School District
 Three Rivers Independent School District (also extends into Bee County)

McMullen County
 McMullen County Independent School District

Nueces County

 Agua Dulce Independent School District (also extends into Jim Wells County)
 Banquete Independent School District
 Bishop Consolidated Independent School District
 Calallen Independent School District
 Corpus Christi Independent School District
 Driscoll Independent School District
 Flour Bluff Independent School District
 London Independent School District
 Port Aransas Independent School District (also extends into Aransas County)
 Robstown Independent School District
 Tuloso-Midway Independent School District
 West Oso Independent School District

San Patricio County

 Aransas Pass Independent School District (also extends into Aransas and Nueces Counties)
 Gregory-Portland Independent School District
 Ingleside Independent School District
 Mathis Independent School District (also extends into Bee and Live Oak Counties)
 Odem-Edroy Independent School District
 Sinton Independent School District
 Taft Independent School District

Region 3

Calhoun County
 Calhoun County Independent School District

Colorado County

 Columbus Independent School District (also extends into Austin County)
 Rice Consolidated Independent School District
 Weimar Independent School District (also extends into Fayette and Lavaca Counties)

DeWitt County

 Cuero Independent School District (also extends into Gonzales County)
 Meyersville Independent School District (also extends into Victoria County)
 Nordheim Independent School District (also extends into Karnes County)
 Westhoff Independent School District
 Yoakum Independent School District (also extends into Gonzales and Lavaca Counties)
 Yorktown Independent School District

Goliad County
 Goliad Independent School District

Jackson County

 Edna Independent School District
 Ganado Independent School District
 Industrial Independent School District (also extends into Victoria County)

Karnes County

 Kenedy Independent School District
 Runge Independent School District

Lavaca County

 Ezzell Independent School District
 Hallettsville Independent School District (also extends into Colorado, Jackson and Wharton Counties; also serves grades 9-12 from Vysehrad Independent School District)
 Moulton Independent School District (also extends into Gonzales County)
 Shiner Independent School District (also extends into Gonzales County)
 Sweet Home Independent School District
 Vysehrad Independent School District

Matagorda County

 Bay City Independent School District
 Matagorda Independent School District
 Palacios Independent School District (also extends into Jackson County)
 Tidehaven Independent School District
 Van Vleck Independent School District

Refugio County

 Austwell-Tivoli Independent School District
 Refugio Independent School District (also extends into Bee and Victoria Counties)
 Woodsboro Independent School District

Victoria County

 Bloomington Independent School District
 Nursery Independent School District
 Victoria Independent School District

Wharton County

 Boling Independent School District (also extends into Matagorda County)
 East Bernard Independent School District
 El Campo Independent School District
 Louise Independent School District
 Wharton Independent School District

Region 4

Brazoria County

 Alvin Independent School District
 Angleton Independent School District
 Brazosport Independent School District
 Columbia-Brazoria Independent School District
 Damon Independent School District
 Danbury Independent School District
 Pearland Independent School District (also extends into Harris County)
 Sweeny Independent School District

Chambers County

 Anahuac Independent School District
 Barbers Hill Independent School District

Fort Bend County

 Lamar Consolidated Independent School District
 Fort Bend Independent School District
 Needville Independent School District
 Stafford Municipal School District (also extends into Harris County)

Galveston County

 Clear Creek Independent School District (also extends into Harris County)
 Dickinson Independent School District
 Friendswood Independent School District
 Galveston Independent School District
 Hitchcock Independent School District
 Santa Fe Independent School District
 Texas City Independent School District

Harris County

 Aldine Independent School District
 Alief Independent School District
 Channelview Independent School District
 Crosby Independent School District
 Cypress-Fairbanks Independent School District
 Deer Park Independent School District
 Galena Park Independent School District
 Goose Creek Consolidated Independent School District (also extends into Chambers County)
 Houston Independent School District
 Huffman Independent School District
 Humble Independent School District (also extends into Montgomery County)
 Katy Independent School District (also extends into Fort Bend and Waller Counties)
 Klein Independent School District
 La Porte Independent School District (also extends into Chambers County)
 Pasadena Independent School District
 Sheldon Independent School District
 Spring Independent School District
 Spring Branch Independent School District
 Tomball Independent School District (also extends into Montgomery County)

Liberty County

 Cleveland Independent School District (also extends into Montgomery and San Jacinto Counties)
 Dayton Independent School District (also extends into Harris County)
 Devers Independent School District
 Tarkington Independent School District

Waller County

 Hempstead Independent School District
 Royal Independent School District
 Waller Independent School District (also extends into Harris County)

Region 5

Chambers County
 East Chambers Independent School District

Galveston County
 High Island Independent School District

Hardin County

 Hardin-Jefferson Independent School District (also extends into Jefferson County)
 Lumberton Independent School District
 Kountze Independent School District
 Silsbee Independent School District
 West Hardin County Consolidated Independent School District

Jasper County

 Brookeland Independent School District (also extends into Newton, Sabine and San Augustine Counties)
 Buna Independent School District
 Evadale Independent School District
 Jasper Independent School District
 Kirbyville Consolidated Independent School District (also extends into Newton County)

Jefferson County

 Beaumont Independent School District
 Hamshire-Fannett Independent School District
 Nederland Independent School District
 Port Arthur Independent School District
 Port Neches-Groves Independent School District
 Sabine Pass Independent School District

Liberty County

 Hardin Independent School District
 Hull-Daisetta Independent School District
 Liberty Independent School District

Newton County

 Burkeville Independent School District
 Deweyville Independent School District
 Newton Independent School District

Orange County

 Bridge City Independent School District
 Little Cypress-Mauriceville Consolidated Independent School District
 Orangefield Independent School District
 Vidor Independent School District (also extends into Jasper County)
 West Orange-Cove Consolidated Independent School District

Tyler County

 Chester Independent School District (also extends into Polk County)
 Colmesneil Independent School District (also extends into Angelina and Jasper Counties)
 Spurger Independent School District
 Warren Independent School District (also extends into Hardin County)
 Woodville Independent School District (also extends into Polk County)

Region 6

Austin County

 Bellville Independent School District
 Brazos Independent School District (also extends into Fort Bend County)
 Sealy Independent School District

Brazos County

 Bryan Independent School District (also extends into Robertson County)
 College Station Independent School District

Burleson County

 Caldwell Independent School District
 Snook Independent School District
 Somerville Independent School District (also extends into Washington County)

Grimes County

 Anderson-Shiro Consolidated Independent School District
 Iola Independent School District
 Navasota Independent School District (also extends into Brazos County)
 Richards Independent School District (also extends into Montgomery and Walker Counties)

Houston County

 Crockett Independent School District
 Grapeland Independent School District
 Kennard Independent School District (also extends into Trinity County)
 Latexo Independent School District
 Lovelady Independent School District

Leon County

 Buffalo Independent School District (also extends into Freestone County)
 Centerville Independent School District
 Leon Independent School District (also extends into Robertson County)
 Normangee Independent School District (also extends into Madison County)
 Oakwood Independent School District (also extends into Freestone County)

Madison County

 Madisonville Consolidated Independent School District (also extends into Grimes County)
 North Zulch Independent School District

Milam County

 Cameron Independent School District
 Gause Independent School District
 Milano Independent School District
 Rockdale Independent School District

Montgomery County

 Conroe Independent School District
 Magnolia Independent School District
 Montgomery Independent School District
 New Caney Independent School District (also extends into Harris County)
 Splendora Independent School District
 Willis Independent School District (also extends into San Jacinto County)

Polk County

 Big Sandy Independent School District
 Corrigan-Camden Independent School District
 Goodrich Independent School District
 Leggett Independent School District
 Livingston Independent School District
 Onalaska Independent School District

Robertson County

 Bremond Independent School District (also extends into Falls County)
 Calvert Independent School District
 Franklin Independent School District
 Hearne Independent School District
 Mumford Independent School District

San Jacinto County

 Coldspring-Oakhurst Consolidated Independent School District
 Shepherd Independent School District

Trinity County

 Apple Springs Independent School District
 Groveton Independent School District (also extends into Houston County)
 Centerville Independent School District
 Trinity Independent School District (also extends into Walker County)

Walker County

 Huntsville Independent School District
 New Waverly Independent School District

Washington County

 Brenham Independent School District (also extends into Austin County)
 Burton Independent School District (also extends into Austin County)

Region 7

Anderson County

 Cayuga Independent School District
 Elkhart Independent School District (also extends into Houston County)
 Frankston Independent School District (also extends into Henderson County)
 Neches Independent School District
 Palestine Independent School District
 Slocum Independent School District
 Westwood Independent School District

Angelina County

 Central Independent School District
 Diboll Independent School District
 Hudson Independent School District
 Huntington Independent School District
 Lufkin Independent School District
 Zavalla Independent School District

Cherokee County

 Alto Independent School District
 Jacksonville Independent School District
 New Summerfield Independent School District
 Rusk Independent School District (also extends into Rusk County)
 Wells Independent School District (also extends into Angelina County)

Gregg County

 Gladewater Independent School District (also extends into Smith and Upshur Counties)
 Kilgore Independent School District (also extends into Rusk County)
 Longview Independent School District
 Pine Tree Independent School District
 Sabine Independent School District
 Spring Hill Independent School District
 White Oak Independent School District

Harrison County

 Elysian Fields Independent School District (also extends into Panola County)
 Hallsville Independent School District
 Harleton Independent School District
 Karnack Independent School District
 Marshall Independent School District
 Waskom Independent School District

Henderson County

 Brownsboro Independent School District (also extends into Van Zandt County)
 Cross Roads Independent School District
 Eustace Independent School District (also extends into Van Zandt County)
 La Poynor Independent School District (also extends into Anderson County)
 Malakoff Independent School District
 Murchison Independent School District
 Trinidad Independent School District

Nacogdoches County

 Central Heights Independent School District
 Chireno Independent School District (also extends into San Augustine County)
 Cushing Independent School District (also extends into Rusk County)
 Douglass Independent School District
 Garrison Independent School District (also extends into Rusk County)
 Martinsville Independent School District
 Nacogdoches Independent School District
 Woden Independent School District

Panola County

 Beckville Independent School District
 Carthage Independent School District
 Gary Independent School District

Rains County
 Rains Independent School District (also extends into Hunt County)

Rusk County

 Carlisle Independent School District (also extends into Cherokee County)
 Henderson Independent School District
 Laneville Independent School District
 Leverett's Chapel Independent School District
 Mount Enterprise Independent School District
 Overton Independent School District
 Tatum Independent School District (also extends into Panola County)
 West Rusk County Consolidated Independent School District

Sabine County

 Hemphill Independent School District
 West Sabine Independent School District

San Augustine County

 Broaddus Independent School District
 San Augustine Independent School District (also extends into Shelby County)

Shelby County

 Center Independent School District
 Excelsior Independent School District
 Joaquin Independent School District (also extends into Panola County)
 Shelbyville Independent School District (also extends into Sabine County)
 Tenaha Independent School District (also extends into Panola County)
 Timpson Independent School District

Smith County

 Arp Independent School District
 Bullard Independent School District (also extends into Cherokee County)
 Chapel Hill Independent School District
 Lindale Independent School District (also extends into Van Zandt County)
 Troup Independent School District (also extends into Cherokee County)
 Tyler Independent School District
 Whitehouse Independent School District
 Winona Independent School District

Upshur County

 Big Sandy Independent School District (also extends into Wood County)
 Gilmer Independent School District (also extends into Camp County)
 Harmony Independent School District (also extends into Wood County)
 New Diana Independent School District (also extends into Harrison County)
 Ore City Independent School District (also extends into Marion and Harrison Counties)
 Union Grove Independent School District
 Union Hill Independent School District (also extends into Wood County)

Van Zandt County

 Edgewood Independent School District
 Grand Saline Independent School District
 Martin's Mill Independent School District
 Fruitvale Independent School District
 Van Independent School District (also extends into Henderson and Smith Counties)

Wood County

 Alba-Golden Independent School District (also extends into Rains County)
 Hawkins Independent School District
 Mineola Independent School District
 Quitman Independent School District
 Winnsboro Independent School District (also extends into Franklin and Hopkins Counties)
 Yantis Independent School District (also extends into Hopkins County)

Region 8

Bowie County

 De Kalb Independent School District
 Hooks Independent School District
 Hubbard Independent School District
 Leary Independent School District
 Liberty-Eylau Independent School District
 Malta Independent School District
 Maud Independent School District
 New Boston Independent School District
 Pleasant Grove Independent School District
 Red Lick Independent School District
 Redwater Independent School District
 Simms Independent School District
 Texarkana Independent School District

Camp County
 Pittsburg Independent School District (also extends into Upshur and Wood Counties)

Cass County

 Atlanta Independent School District
 Avinger Independent School District (also extends into Marion County)
 Bloomburg Independent School District
 Hughes Springs Independent School District (also extends into Morris County)
 Linden-Kildare Consolidated Independent School District
 McLeod Independent School District
 Queen City Independent School District

Delta County

 Cooper Independent School District (also extends into Hunt County)
 Fannindel Independent School District (also extends into Fannin, Hunt and Lamar Counties)

Fannin County
 Honey Grove Independent School District (also extends into Lamar County)

Franklin County
 Mount Vernon Independent School District (also extends into Hopkins County)

Hopkins County

 Como-Pickton Consolidated Independent School District (also extends into Wood County)
 Cumby Independent School District (also extends into Hunt County)
 Miller Grove Independent School District (also extends into Rains County)
 North Hopkins Independent School District
 Saltillo Independent School District (also extends into Franklin County)
 Sulphur Bluff Independent School District (also extends into Franklin County)
 Sulphur Springs Independent School District

Lamar County

 Chisum Independent School District (also extends into Delta County)
 North Lamar Independent School District (also extends into Fannin County)
 Paris Independent School District
 Prairiland Independent School District (also extends into Red River County)

Marion County
 Jefferson Independent School District

Morris County

 Daingerfield-Lone Star Independent School District (also extends into Titus County)
 Pewitt Consolidated Independent School District (also extends into Cass and Titus Counties)

Red River County

 Avery Independent School District
 Clarksville Independent School District
 Detroit Independent School District
 Rivercrest Independent School District (also extends into Franklin and Titus Counties)

Titus County

 Chapel Hill Independent School District
 Harts Bluff Independent School District
 Mount Pleasant Independent School District

Region 9

Archer County

 Archer City Independent School District
 Holliday Independent School District (also extends into Wichita County)
 Windthorst Independent School District (also extends into Clay County)

Baylor County
 Seymour Independent School District (also extends into Knox County

Clay County

 Bellevue Independent School District
 Henrietta Independent School District
 Midway Independent School District (also extends into Jack County)
 Petrolia Consolidated Independent School District

Foard County
 Crowell Independent School District (also extends into King and Knox Counties)

Hardeman County

 Chillicothe Independent School District (also extends into Wilbarger County)
 Quanah Independent School District (also extends into Cottle County)

Jack County

 Bryson Independent School District (also extends into Young County)
 Jacksboro Independent School District (also extends into Archer and Wise Counties)
 Perrin-Whitt Consolidated Independent School District (also extends into Palo Pinto and Parker Counties)

Knox County

 Benjamin Independent School District
 Knox City-O'Brien Consolidated Independent School District (also extends into Haskell County)
 Munday Consolidated Independent School District (also extends into Haskell and Throckmorton Counties)

Montague County

 Bowie Independent School District (also extends into Clay, Jack and Wise Counties)
 Forestburg Independent School District
 Gold-Burg Independent School District (also extends into Clay County)
 Montague Independent School District
 Nocona Independent School District
 Prairie Valley Independent School District
 Saint Jo Independent School District (also extends into Cooke County)

Throckmorton County

 Throckmorton Collegiate Independent School District
 Woodson Independent School District (also extends into Stephens and Young Counties)

Wichita County

 Burkburnett Independent School District (also extends into Clay County)
 City View Independent School District
 Electra Independent School District
 Iowa Park Consolidated Independent School District (also extends into Archer County)
 Wichita Falls Independent School District

Wilbarger County

 Harrold Independent School District
 Northside Independent School District
 Vernon Independent School District (also extends into Foard County)

Young County

 Graham Independent School District (also extends into Stephens County
 Newcastle Independent School District
 Olney Independent School District (also extends into Archer, Baylor and Throckmorton Counties)

Region 10

Collin County

 Allen Independent School District
 Anna Independent School District
 Blue Ridge Independent School District (also extends into Fannin County)
 Celina Independent School District (also extends into Denton and Grayson Counties)
 Community Independent School District (also extends into Hunt County)
 Farmersville Independent School District
 Frisco Independent School District (also extends into Denton County)
 Lovejoy Independent School District
 McKinney Independent School District
 Melissa Independent School District
 Plano Independent School District
 Princeton Independent School District
 Prosper Independent School District (also extends into Denton County)
 Wylie Independent School District

Dallas County

 Carrollton-Farmers Branch Independent School District (also extends into Denton County)
 Cedar Hill Independent School District
 Coppell Independent School District
 Dallas Independent School District
 DeSoto Independent School District
 Duncanville Independent School District
 Garland Independent School District
 Grand Prairie Independent School District
 Highland Park Independent School District
 Irving Independent School District
 Lancaster Independent School District
 Mesquite Independent School District
 Richardson Independent School District
 Sunnyvale Independent School District

Ellis County

 Avalon Independent School District
 Ennis Independent School District (also extends into Navarro County)
 Ferris Independent School District (also extends into Dallas County)
 Italy Independent School District
 Maypearl Independent School District
 Midlothian Independent School District
 Milford Independent School District (also extends into Hill County)
 Palmer Independent School District
 Red Oak Independent School District
 Waxahachie Independent School District

Fannin County

 Bonham Independent School District
 Dodd City Independent School District
 Ector Independent School District
 Leonard Independent School District (also extends into Collin and Hunt Counties)
 Sam Rayburn Independent School District
 Savoy Independent School District
 Trenton Independent School District (also extends into Collin and Grayson Counties)

Grayson County

 Bells Independent School District
 Collinsville Independent School District (also extends into Cooke County)
 Denison Independent School District
 Gunter Independent School District (also extends into Collin County)
 Howe Independent School District
 Pottsboro Independent School District
 S and S Consolidated Independent School District
 Sherman Independent School District
 Tioga Independent School District
 Tom Bean Independent School District
 Van Alstyne Independent School District (also extends into Collin County)
 Whitesboro Independent School District (also extends into Cooke County)
 Whitewright Independent School District (also extends into Collin and Fannin Counties)

Henderson County
 Athens Independent School District (also extends into Anderson and Van Zandt Counties)

Hunt County

 Bland Independent School District (also extends into Collin County)
 Boles Independent School District
 Caddo Mills Independent School District
 Campbell Independent School District
 Celeste Independent School District
 Commerce Independent School District (also extends into Delta County)
 Greenville Independent School District
 Lone Oak Independent School District (also extends into Rains County)
 Quinlan Independent School District (also extends into Kaufman County)
 Wolfe City Independent School District (also extends into Fannin County)

Kaufman County

 Crandall Independent School District
 Forney Independent School District
 Kaufman Independent School District
 Kemp Independent School District (also extends into Henderson County)
 Mabank Independent School District (also extends into Henderson and Van Zandt Counties)
 Scurry-Rosser Independent School District
 Terrell Independent School District (also extends into Hunt County)

Rockwall County

 Rockwall Independent School District (also extends into Collin and Kaufman Counties)
 Royse City Independent School District (also extends into Collin and Hunt Counties)

Van Zandt

 Canton Independent School District
 Wills Point Independent School District (also extends into Kaufman County)

Region 11

Cooke County

 Callisburg Independent School District
 Era Independent School District (also extends into Denton County)
 Gainesville Independent School District
 Lindsay Independent School District
 Muenster Independent School District
 Sivells Bend Independent School District
 Valley View Independent School District
 Walnut Bend Independent School District

Denton County

 Argyle Independent School District
 Aubrey Independent School District
 Denton Independent School District
 Krum Independent School District (also extends into Wise County)
 Lake Dallas Independent School District
 Lewisville Independent School District (also extends into Tarrant County)
 Little Elm Independent School District
 Northwest Independent School District (also extends into Tarrant and Wise Counties)
 Pilot Point Independent School District (also extends into Cooke and Grayson Counties)
 Ponder Independent School District
 Sanger Independent School District

Erath County

 Bluff Dale Independent School District (also extends into Hood County)
 Dublin Independent School District (also extends into Comanche County)
 Huckabay Independent School District (also extends into Eastland County)
 Lingleville Independent School District (also extends into Comanche and Eastland Counties)
 Morgan Mill Independent School District
 Stephenville Independent School District
 Three Way Independent School District (also extends into Somervell County)

Hood County

 Granbury Independent School District (also extends into Johnson, Parker and Somervell Counties)
 Lipan Independent School District (also extends into Erath, Palo Pinto and Parker Counties)
 Tolar Independent School District

Johnson County

 Alvarado Independent School District
 Burleson Independent School District (also extends into Tarrant County)
 Cleburne Independent School District
 Godley Independent School District (also extends into Hood and Tarrant Counties)
 Grandview Independent School District (also extends into Hill County)
 Joshua Independent School District
 Keene Independent School District
 Rio Vista Independent School District (also extends into Hill County)
 Venus Independent School District

Palo Pinto County

 Gordon Independent School District (also extends into Erath County)
 Graford Independent School District (also extends into Jack County)
 Mineral Wells Independent School District (also extends into Parker County)
 Palo Pinto Independent School District
 Santo Independent School District (also extends into Erath County)
 Strawn Independent School District

Parker County

 Aledo Independent School District (also extends into Tarrant County)
 Brock Independent School District
 Garner Independent School District
 Millsap Independent School District (also extends into Palo Pinto County)
 Peaster Independent School District
 Poolville Independent School District (also extends into Wise County)
 Springtown Independent School District (also extends into Wise County)
 Weatherford Independent School District

Somervell County
 Glen Rose Independent School District (also extends into Hood County)

Tarrant County

 Arlington Independent School District
 Azle Independent School District (also extends into Parker and Wise Counties)
 Birdville Independent School District
 Carroll Independent School District
 Castleberry Independent School District
 Crowley Independent School District (also extends into Johnson County)
 Eagle Mountain-Saginaw Independent School District
 Everman Independent School District
 Fort Worth Independent School District
 Grapevine-Colleyville Independent School District (also extends into Dallas County)
 Hurst-Euless-Bedford Independent School District
 Keller Independent School District
 Kennedale Independent School District
 Lake Worth Independent School District
 Mansfield Independent School District (also extends into Johnson County)
 White Settlement Independent School District

Wise County

 Alvord Independent School District (also extends into Montague County)
 Boyd Independent School District
 Bridgeport Independent School District
 Chico Independent School District
 Decatur Independent School District
 Paradise Independent School District
 Slidell Independent School District (also extends into Cooke, Denton and Montague Counties)

Region 12

Bell County

 Academy Independent School District
 Belton Independent School District
 Holland Independent School District (also extends into Milam County)
 Killeen Independent School District (also extends into Coryell County)
 Rogers Independent School District (also extends into Milam County)
 Salado Independent School District
 Temple Independent School District
 Troy Independent School District (also extends into Falls County)

Bosque County

 Clifton Independent School District (also extends into Coryell County)
 Cranfills Gap Independent School District (also extends into Hamilton County)
 Iredell Independent School District (also extends into Erath County)
 Kopperl Independent School District
 Meridian Independent School District
 Morgan Independent School District
 Valley Mills Independent School District (also extends into Coryell and McLennan Counties)
 Walnut Springs Independent School District (also extends into Somervell County)

Coryell County

 Copperas Cove Independent School District (also extends into Bell County)
 Evant Independent School District (also extends into Hamilton and Lampasas Counties)
 Jonesboro Independent School District (also extends into Bosque and Hamilton Counties)
 Gatesville Independent School District (also extends into Bell County)
 Oglesby Independent School District (also extends into McLennan County)

Falls County

 Chilton Independent School District
 Marlin Independent School District
 Rosebud-Lott Independent School District (also extends into Bell and Milam Counties)
 Westphalia Independent School District

Freestone County

 Dew Independent School District
 Fairfield Independent School District (also extends into Navarro County)
 Teague Independent School District
 Wortham Independent School District (also extends into Limestone and Navarro Counties)

Hamilton County

 Hamilton Independent School District (also extends into Comanche and Mills Counties)
 Hico Independent School District (also extends into Bosque, Comanche and Erath Counties)

Hill County

 Abbott Independent School District
 Aquilla Independent School District
 Blum Independent School District
 Bynum Independent School District (also extends into Navarro County)
 Covington Independent School District
 Hillsboro Independent School District
 Hubbard Independent School District (also extends into Limestone and Navarro Counties)
 Itasca Independent School District
 Malone Independent School District
 Mount Calm Independent School District (also extends into Limestone County)
 Penelope Independent School District
 Whitney Independent School District

Lampasas County

 Lampasas Independent School District (also extends into Bell, Burnet and Coryell Counties)
 Lometa Independent School District (also extends into Mills County)

Limestone County

 Coolidge Independent School District
 Groesbeck Independent School District (also extends into Falls and Robertson Counties)
 Mexia Independent School District (also extends into Freestone County)

McLennan County

 Axtell Independent School District (also extends into Hill and Limestone Counties)
 Bosqueville Independent School District
 Bruceville-Eddy Independent School District (also extends into Bell and Falls Counties)
 China Spring Independent School District (also extends into Bosque County)
 Connally Independent School District
 Crawford Independent School District (also extends into Coryell County)
 Gholson Independent School District
 Hallsburg Independent School District
 La Vega Independent School District
 Lorena Independent School District (also extends into Falls County)
 Mart Independent School District (also extends into Falls and Limestone Counties)
 McGregor Independent School District
 Midway Independent School District
 Moody Independent School District (also extends into Bell and Coryell Counties)
 Riesel Independent School District (also extends into Falls County)
 Robinson Independent School District (also extends into Falls County)
 Waco Independent School District
 West Independent School District (also extends into Hill County)

Milam County
 Buckholts Independent School District

Mills County

 Goldthwaite Independent School District (also extends into Hamilton and Lampasas Counties)
 Mullin Independent School District (also extends into Brown and Comanche Counties)
 Priddy Independent School District (also extends into Comanche County)

Navarro County

 Blooming Grove Independent School District
 Corsicana Independent School District (also extends into Freestone County)
 Dawson Independent School District (also extends into Hill County)
 Frost Independent School District (also extends into Ellis and Hill Counties)
 Kerens Independent School District
 Mildred Independent School District
 Rice Independent School District

Region 13

Bastrop County

 Bastrop Independent School District
 Elgin Independent School District (also extends into Lee and Travis Counties)
 McDade Independent School District
 Smithville Independent School District (also extends into Fayette County)

Bell County
 Bartlett Independent School District (also extends into Milam and Williamson Counties)

Blanco County

 Blanco Independent School District (also extends into Hays and Kendall Counties)
 Johnson City Independent School District (also extends into Hays, Llano and Travis Counties)

Burnet County

 Burnet Consolidated Independent School District (also extends into Llano and Williamson Counties)
 Marble Falls Independent School District (also extends into Travis County)

Caldwell County

 Lockhart Independent School District
 Luling Independent School District (also extends into Guadalupe County)
 Prairie Lea Independent School District (also extends into Guadalupe County)

Comal County
 New Braunfels Independent School District (also extends into Guadalupe County)

Fayette County

 Flatonia Independent School District
 La Grange Independent School District
 Fayetteville Independent School District
 Round Top-Carmine Independent School District
 Schulenburg Independent School District

Gillespie County

 Doss Consolidated Common School District (also extends into Mason County)
 Fredericksburg Independent School District (also extends into Blanco and Kendall Counties)
 Harper Independent School District (also extends into Kerr and Kimble Counties)

Gonzales County

 Gonzales Independent School District (also extends into Caldwell County)
 Nixon-Smiley Consolidated Independent School District (also extends into Guadalupe, Karnes and Wilson Counties)
 Waelder Independent School District (also extends into Caldwell County)

Hays County

 Dripping Springs Independent School District (also extends into Travis County)
 Hays Consolidated Independent School District (also extends into Caldwell and Travis Counties)
 San Marcos Consolidated Independent School District (also extends into Caldwell and Guadalupe Counties)
 Wimberley Independent School District (also extends into Comal County)

Kendall County
 Comfort Independent School District (also extends into Kerr County)

Lee County

 Dime Box Independent School District
 Giddings Independent School District (also extends into Fayette and Washington Counties)
 Lexington Independent School District (also extends into Bastrop, Milam and Williamson Counties)

Llano County
 Llano Independent School District

Milam County
 Thorndale Independent School District (also extends into Williamson County)

Travis County

 Austin Independent School District
 Del Valle Independent School District
 Eanes Independent School District
 Lago Vista Independent School District
 Lake Travis Independent School District
 Manor Independent School District
 Pflugerville Independent School District (also extends into Williamson County)

Williamson County

 Coupland Independent School District (also extends into Travis County)
 Florence Independent School District (also extends into Bell County)
 Georgetown Independent School District
 Granger Independent School District
 Hutto Independent School District (also extends into Travis County)
 Jarrell Independent School District
 Leander Independent School District (also extends into Travis County)
 Liberty Hill Independent School District
 Round Rock Independent School District (also extends into Travis County)
 Taylor Independent School District
 Thrall Independent School District

Region 14

Callahan County

 Baird Independent School District
 Clyde Consolidated Independent School District (also extends into Jones, Shackelford and Taylor Counties)
 Cross Plains Independent School District (also extends into Brown, Coleman and Eastland Counties)
 Eula Independent School District (also extends into Taylor County)

Comanche County

 Comanche Independent School District (also extends into Mills County)
 De Leon Independent School District (also extends into Eastland and Erath Counties)
 Gustine Independent School District
 Sidney Independent School District

Eastland County

 Cisco Independent School District (also extends into Callahan County)
 Eastland Independent School District
 Gorman Independent School District (also extends into Comanche County)
 Ranger Independent School District (also extends into Stephens County)
 Rising Star Independent School District (also extends into Brown and Comanche Counties)

Fisher County

 Roby Consolidated Independent School District (also extends into Jones County)
 Rotan Independent School District (also extends into Kent and Stonewall Counties)

Haskell County

 Haskell Consolidated Independent School District (also extends into Stonewall County)
 Paint Creek Independent School District (also extends into Jones County)
 Rule Independent School District (also extends into Stonewall County)

Jones County

 Anson Independent School District
 Hamlin Collegiate Independent School District (also extends into Fisher and Stonewall Counties)
 Hawley Independent School District
 Lueders-Avoca Independent School District (also extends into Shackelford County)
 Stamford Independent School District (also extends into Haskell County)

Mitchell County

 Colorado Independent School District (also extends into Scurry County)
 Loraine Independent School District
 Westbrook Independent School District

Nolan County

 Blackwell Consolidated Independent School District (also extends into Coke and Taylor Counties)
 Highland Independent School District
 Roscoe Independent School District (also extends into Fisher, Nolan and Scurry Counties)
 Sweetwater Independent School District (also extends into Fisher County)

Scurry County

 Hermleigh Independent School District (also extends into Fisher County)
 Ira Independent School District (also extends into Mitchell County)
 Snyder Independent School District (also extends into Kent County)

Shackelford County

 Albany Independent School District (also extends into Stephens County)
 Moran Independent School District (also extends into Callahan and Stephens County)

Stephens County
 Breckenridge Independent School District

Stonewall County
 Aspermont Independent School District

Taylor County

 Abilene Independent School District (also extends into Jones County)
 Jim Ned Consolidated Independent School District (also extends into Runnels County)
 Merkel Independent School District (also extends into Jones County)
 Trent Independent School District (also extends into Fisher, Jones and Nolan Counties)
 Wylie Independent School District

Region 15

Brown County

 Bangs Independent School District (also extends into Coleman County)
 Blanket Independent School District (also extends into Comanche County)
 Brookesmith Independent School District (also extends into Mills County)
 Brownwood Independent School District
 Early Independent School District
 May Independent School District (also extends into Comanche County)
 Zephyr Independent School District (also extends into Comanche and Mills Counties)

Coke County

 Bronte Independent School District (also extends into Runnels County)
 Robert Lee Independent School District

Coleman County

 Coleman Independent School District (also extends into Runnels County)
 Panther Creek Consolidated Independent School District (also extends into Runnels County)
 Santa Anna Independent School District

Concho County

 Eden Consolidated Independent School District (also extends into Menard County)
 Paint Rock Independent School District

Crane County
 Crane Independent School District

Crockett County
 Crockett County Consolidated Common School District

Edwards County

 Rocksprings Independent School District (also extends into Val Verde County)
 Nueces Canyon Consolidated Independent School District (also extends into Real and Uvalde Counties)

Irion County
 Irion County Independent School District

Kimble County
 Junction Independent School District

Mason County
 Mason Independent School District (also extends into Kimble, McCullouch, Menard and San Saba Counties)

McCulloch County

 Brady Independent School District (also extends into Concho County)
 Lohn Independent School District
 Rochelle Independent School District

Menard County
 Menard Independent School District

Runnels County

 Ballinger Independent School District
 Miles Independent School District (also extends into Tom Green County)
 Olfen Independent School District
 Winters Independent School District (also extends into Taylor County)

San Saba County

 Cherokee Independent School District
 Richland Springs Independent School District
 San Saba Independent School District

Schleicher County
 Schleicher Independent School District

Sterling County
 Sterling City Independent School District

Sutton County
 Sonora Independent School District

Tom Green County

 Christoval Independent School District
 Grape Creek Independent School District
 San Angelo Independent School District
 Veribest Independent School District
 Wall Independent School District
 Water Valley Independent School District (also extends into Coke County)

Val Verde County

 Comstock Independent School District
 San Felipe-Del Rio Consolidated Independent School District

Region 16

Armstrong County
 Claude Independent School District

Briscoe County
 Silverton Independent School District

Carson County

 Groom Independent School District (also extends into Armstrong, Donley and Gray Counties)
 Panhandle Independent School District
 White Deer Independent School District (also extends into Gray County)

Castro County

 Dimmitt Independent School District
 Hart Independent School District
 Nazareth Independent School District

Childress County
 Childress Independent School District (also extends into Cottle, Hall and Hardeman Counties)

Collingsworth County
 Wellington Independent School District (also extends into Childress County)

Dallam County

 Dalhart Independent School District (also extends into Hartley County)
 Texline Independent School District

Deaf Smith County

 Hereford Independent School District (also extends into Castro and Parmer Counties)
 Walcott Independent School District

Donley County

 Clarendon Independent School District (also extends into Armstrong and Briscoe Counties)
 Hedley Independent School District (also extends into Collingsworth County)

Gray County

 Grandview-Hopkins Independent School District
 Lefors Independent School District
 McLean Independent School District (also extends into Collingsworth, Donley and Wheeler Counties)
 Pampa Independent School District (also extends into Roberts County)

Hall County

 Memphis Independent School District (also extends into Childress, Collingsworth and Donley Counties)
 Turkey-Quitaque Independent School District (also extends into Briscoe, Floyd and Motley Counties)

Hansford County

 Gruver Independent School District (also extends into Sherman County)
 Pringle-Morse Consolidated Independent School District (also extends into Hutchinson, Moore and Sherman Counties)
 Spearman Independent School District (also extends into Hutchinson and Ochiltree Counties)

Hartley County

 Channing Independent School District (also extends into Oldham County)
 Hartley Independent School District

Hemphill County
 Canadian Independent School District (also extends into Lipscomb County)

Hutchinson County

 Borger Independent School District
 Plemons-Stinnett-Phillips Consolidated Independent School District
 Sanford-Fritch Independent School District (also extends into Carson and Moore Counties)
 Spring Creek Independent School District

Lipscomb County

 Booker Independent School District (also extends into Hemphill and Ochiltree Counties)
 Darrouzett Independent School District
 Follett Independent School District

Moore County

 Dumas Independent School District
 Sunray Independent School District (also extends into Sherman County)

Ochiltree County
 Perryton Independent School District

Oldham County

 Adrian Independent School District (also extends into Deaf Smith County)
 Boys Ranch Independent School District
 Vega Independent School District (also extends into Deaf Smith County)
 Wildorado Independent School District (also extends into Deaf Smith and Randall Counties)

Parmer County

 Bovina Independent School District
 Farwell Independent School District (also extends into Bailey County)
 Friona Independent School District (also extends into Deaf Smith County)
 Lazbuddie Independent School District (also extends into Castro County)

Potter County

 Amarillo Independent School District (also extends into Randall County)
 Bushland Independent School District (also extends into Randall County)
 Highland Park Independent School District
 River Road Independent School District

Randall County
 Canyon Independent School District

Roberts County
 Miami Independent School District (also extends into Gray County)

Sherman County

 Stratford Independent School District (also extends into Dallam County)
 Texhoma Independent School District (also extends into Hansford County)

Swisher County

 Happy Independent School District (also extends into Armstrong, Castro and Randall Counties)
 Kress Independent School District
 Tulia Independent School District

Wheeler County

 Fort Elliott Consolidated Independent School District (also extends into Gray and Hemphill Counties)
 Kelton Independent School District
 Shamrock Independent School District (also extends into Collingsworth County)
 Wheeler Independent School District (also extends into Gray County)

Region 17

Bailey County
 Muleshoe Independent School District

Borden County
 Borden County Independent School District (also extends into Howard County)

Cochran County

 Morton Independent School District
 Whiteface Consolidated Independent School District (also extends into Hockley and Lamb Counties)

Cottle County
 Paducah Independent School District

Crosby County

 Crosbyton Consolidated Independent School District (also extends into Garza County)
 Lorenzo Independent School District (also extends into Lubbock County)
 Ralls Independent School District

Dawson County

 Dawson Independent School District (also extends into Lynn and Terry Counties)
 Klondike Independent School District (also extends into Martin County)
 Lamesa Independent School District
 Sands Consolidated Independent School District (also extends into Borden, Howard and Martin Counties)

Dickens County

 Patton Springs Independent School District
 Spur Independent School District (also extends into Kent County)

Floyd County

 Floydada Independent School District
 Lockney Independent School District (also extends into Hale County)

Gaines County

 Loop Independent School District (also extends into Terry County)
 Seagraves Independent School District (also extends into Terry and Yoakum Counties)
 Seminole Independent School District

Garza County

 Post Independent School District (also extends into Kent and Lynn Counties)
 Southland Independent School District (also extends into Lubbock and Lynn Counties)

Hale County

 Abernathy Independent School District (also extends into Lubbock County)
 Cotton Center Independent School District
 Hale Center Independent School District
 Petersburg Independent School District (also extends into Crosby and Floyd Counties)
 Plainview Independent School District (also extends into Floyd County)

Hockley County

 Anton Independent School District (also extends into Lamb County)
 Levelland Independent School District
 Ropes Independent School District (also extends into Terry County)
 Smyer Independent School District
 Sundown Independent School District
 Whitharral Independent School District

Kent County
 Jayton-Girard Independent School District

King County
 Guthrie Common School District

Lamb County

 Amherst Independent School District
 Littlefield Independent School District
 Olton Independent School District (also extends into Hale County)
 Springlake-Earth Independent School District (also extends into Castro County)
 Sudan Independent School District (also extends into Bailey and Cochran Counties)

Lubbock County

 Frenship Independent School District (also extends into Hockley County)
 Idalou Independent School District
 Lubbock Independent School District
 Lubbock-Cooper Independent School District
 New Deal Independent School District
 Roosevelt Independent School District
 Shallowater Independent School District
 Slaton Independent School District (also extends into Lynn County)

Lynn County

 New Home Independent School District
 O'Donnell Independent School District (also extends into Dawson and Terry Counties)
 Tahoka Independent School District (also extends into Terry County)
 Wilson Independent School District

Motley County
 Motley County Independent School District (also extends into Floyd County)

Terry County

 Brownfield Independent School District (also extends into Yoakum County)
 Meadow Independent School District
 Wellman-Union Consolidated Independent School District (also extends into Gaines County)

Yoakum County

 Denver City Independent School District
 Plains Independent School District

Region 18

Andrews County
 Andrews Independent School District

Brewster County

 Alpine Independent School District
 Marathon Independent School District
 San Vicente Independent School District
 Terlingua Common School District

Culberson County
 Culberson County-Allamoore Independent School District (also extends into Hudspeth County)

Ector County
 Ector County Independent School District

Glasscock County
 Glasscock County Independent School District

Howard County

 Big Spring Independent School District
 Coahoma Independent School District
 Forsan Independent School District (also extends into Mitchell County)

Jeff Davis County

 Fort Davis Independent School District
 Valentine Independent School District

Martin County

 Grady Independent School District
 Stanton Independent School District (also extends into Howard County)

Midland County

 Greenwood Independent School District
 Midland Independent School District

Pecos County

 Buena Vista Independent School District
 Fort Stockton Independent School District
 Iraan-Sheffield Independent School District

Presidio County

 Marfa Independent School District
 Presidio Independent School District

Reagan County
 Reagan County Independent School District

Reeves County

 Balmorhea Independent School District
 Pecos-Barstow-Toyah Independent School District (also extends into Ward County)

Terrell County
 Terrell County Independent School District

Upton County

 McCamey Independent School District
 Rankin Independent School District

Ward County

 Grandfalls-Royalty Independent School District
 Monahans-Wickett-Pyote Independent School District

Winkler County

 Kermit Independent School District
 Wink-Loving Independent School District (also extends into Loving County)

Region 19

El Paso County

 Anthony Independent School District
 Canutillo Independent School District
 Clint Independent School District
 El Paso Independent School District
 Fabens Independent School District
 San Elizario Independent School District
 Socorro Independent School District
 Tornillo Independent School District
 Ysleta Independent School District

Hudspeth County

 Dell City Independent School District
 Fort Hancock Independent School District
 Sierra Blanca Independent School District

Region 20

Atascosa County

 Charlotte Independent School District (also extends into Frio County)
 Jourdanton Independent School District
 Lytle Independent School District (also extends into Medina County)
 Pleasanton Independent School District
 Poteet Independent School District

Bandera County

 Bandera Independent School District
 Medina Independent School District (also extends into Kerr County)

Bexar County

 Alamo Heights Independent School District
 East Central Independent School District
 Edgewood Independent School District
 Fort Sam Houston Independent School District
 Harlandale Independent School District
 Judson Independent School District
 Lackland Independent School District
 North East Independent School District
 Northside Independent School District (also extends into Bandera and Medina Counties)
 Randolph Field Independent School District
 San Antonio Independent School District
 Somerset Independent School District (also extends into Atascosa County)
 South San Antonio Independent School District
 Southside Independent School District
 Southwest Independent School District

Comal County
 Comal Independent School District (also extends into Bexar, Guadalupe, Hays and Kendall Counties)

Dimmit County
 Carrizo Springs Consolidated Independent School District

Frio County

 Dilley Independent School District (also extends into La Salle County)
 Pearsall Independent School District

Guadalupe County

 Marion Independent School District
 Navarro Independent School District
 Seguin Independent School District
 Schertz-Cibolo-Universal City Independent School District (also extends into Bexar County)

Karnes County

 Falls City Independent School District (also extends into Wilson County)
 Karnes City Independent School District (also extends into Atascosa County)

Kendall County
 Boerne Independent School District (also extends into Bexar and Comal Counties)

Kerr County

 Center Point Independent School District
 Divide Independent School District
 Hunt Independent School District
 Ingram Independent School District
 Kerrville Independent School District

Kinney County
 Brackett Independent School District

La Salle County
 Cotulla Independent School District

Maverick County
 Eagle Pass Independent School District

Medina County

 D'Hanis Independent School District
 Devine Independent School District (also extends into Frio County)
 Hondo Independent School District (also extends into Frio County)
 Medina Valley Independent School District (also extends into Bexar County)
 Natalia Independent School District

Real County
 Leakey Independent School District (also extends into Uvalde County)

Uvalde County

 Knippa Independent School District
 Sabinal Independent School District
 Utopia Independent School District (also extends into Bandera, Medina and Real Counties)
 Uvalde Consolidated Independent School District (also extends into Real and Zavala Counties)

Wilson County

 Floresville Independent School District (also extends into Bexar County)
 La Vernia Independent School District (also extends into Guadalupe County)
 Poth Independent School District
 Stockdale Independent School District

Zavala County

 Crystal City Independent School District
 La Pryor Independent School District

Defunct school districts
During Texas' history, many school districts have consolidated into other districts

 Addicks Independent School District (divided between the Katy Independent School District, Houston Independent School District, and Spring Branch Independent School District)
 Addison Independent School District (became a part of the Dallas Independent School District)
 Allamoore Consolidated Independent School District (renamed Allamore Independent School District on July 1, 1992)
 Allamoore Independent School District (consolidated with Culberson County Independent School District to form Culberson County-Allamoore Independent School District on July 1, 1995)
 Alanreed Independent School District (abolished on July 1, 1993)
 Allison Independent School District (consolidated with Fort Elliott Independent School District on July 1, 2003)
 Alton Independent School District (merged with Mission ISD to form Mission Consolidated Independent School District on January 27, 1975)
 Asherton Independent School District (consolidated with Carrizo Springs Independent School District on July 1, 1999)
 Blackwell Independent School District (consolidated to Divide Independent School District (Nolan County) to form Blackwell Consolidated Independent School District on September 1, 1985)
 Bledsoe Independent School District (consolidated with Whiteface Consolidated Independent School District on July 1, 1996)
 Briscoe Independent School District (consolidated with Mobeetie Independent School District to form Fort Elliott Consolidated Independent School District on August 10, 1991)
 Bronson Independent School District (merged with Pineland ISD to form the West Sabine Independent School District)
 Byers Independent School District (consolidated with Petrolia Independent School District to from Petrolia Independent School District on May 25, 2012)
 Carbon Independent School District (annexed to Eastland Independent School District on July 1, 1990)
 Carta Valley Independent School District (annexed to Rocksprings Independent School District on April 30, 1985)
 Culberson County Independent School District (consolidated with Allamoore Independent School District to form Culberson County-Allamoore Independent School District on July 1, 1995)
 Delmar Independent School District (consolidated with West Lamar Independent School District to form Delmar-West Lamar Consolidated Independent School District on July 1, 1985)
 Delmar-West Lamar Consolidated Independent School District (renamed Chisum Independent School District on August 21, 1986)
 Divide Common School District (reclassified as Divide Independent School District on July 1, 1988)
 Divide Independent School District (Nolan County) (consolidated to Blackwell Independent School District to form Blackwell Consolidated Independent School District on September 1, 1985)
 Dougherty Independent School District (annexed to Floydada Independent School District on July 1, 1987)
 Eola Independent School District (consolidated with Eden Consolidated Independent School District on September 1, 1983)
 Estelline Independent School District (annexed to Childress Independent School District on July 1, 1985, declared a dormant school district on July 1, 1987, and annexed to Memphis Independent School District on July 1, 1989)
 Etoile Independent School District (annexed to Woden Independent School District on July 1, 2022)
 Fannett Independent School District (merged with Hamshire-New Holland Independent School District in 1961 to form the Hamshire-Fannett Independent School District)
 Goree Independent School District (consolidated with Munday Independent School District to form Munday Consolidated Independent School District)
 Hamshire-New Holland Independent School District (merged with Fannett Independent School District in 1961 to form the Hamshire-Fannett Independent School District)
 Higgins Independent School District (consolidated with Canadian Independent School District on July 1, 2020)
 Hobbs Independent School District (annexed to Roby Independent School District, Rotan Independent School District, and Snyder Independent School District on July 1, 1990)
 Honey Grove Independent School District (consolidated with Windom Independent School District and renamed Honey Grove Consolidated Independent School District on July 1, 1987)
 Juno Independent School District (consolidated with Comstock Independent School District on July 1, 1992)
 Kendleton Independent School District (annexed to Lamar Consolidated Independent School District in March 25, 2010)
 La Marque Independent School District (annexed to Texas City Independent School District on July 1, 2016)
 Lakeview Independent School District (consolidated with Memphis Independent School District on July 1, 2000)
 Laureles Independent School District (annexed to Riviera Independent School District on July 1, 1993)
 Lela Independent School District (closed on July 1, 1991 with the education services in the area provided by Samnorwood Independent School District and Shamrock Independent School District, and annexed into the latter district on July 1, 1992)
 Liberty Chapel Independent School District (annexed to Cleburne Independent School District on July 1, 1988)
 Lillian Independent School District (annexed to Alvarado Independent School District on July 1, 1986)
 Marietta Independent School District (consolidated with Pewitt Independent School District to form Pewitt Consolidated Independent School District on September 1, 2008)
 Masonic Home Independent School District (closed on April 29, 2005, effective August 31, 2005; the district served a Masonic-operated children's home which was closed and the property sold, the property is now part of the Fort Worth Independent School District)
 Maydelle Independent School District (annexed to Rusk Independent School District on July 1, 1989)
 McAdoo Independent School District (annexed to Crosbyton Independent School District, Rusk Independent School District, and Spur Independent School District on July 1, 1985)
 McCauley Independent School District (consolidated with Roby Independent School District on July 1, 1990)
 McFaddin Independent School District (consolidated with Refugio Independent School District on July 1, 1994)
 Megargel Independent School District (consolidated wit Olney Independent School District on July 1, 2006)
 Mirando City Independent School District (consolidated with Webb Consolidated Independent School District on July 1, 2005)
 Missouri City Independent School District (merged with Sugar Land ISD into Fort Bend Independent School District)
 Mobeetie Independent School District (consolidated with Briscoe Independent School District to form Fort Elliott Consolidated Independent School District on August 10, 1991)
 Mozelle Independent School District (consolidated with Talpa Independent School District and renamed Panther Creek Independent School District on July 1, 1986)
 Munday Independent School District (consolidated with Goree Independent School District to form Munday Consolidated Independent School District)
 North Forest Independent School District (annexed to Houston Independent School District on July 1, 2013)
 North Houston Independent School District (dissolved and split between  Aldine ISD, Cypress-Fairbanks ISD, and Klein ISD in 1949)
 Novice Independent School District (consolidated with Coleman Independent School District on March 1, 2013)
 Old Glory Independent School District (annexed to Aspermont Independent School District on July 1, 1985)
 Petrolia Independent School District (consolidated with Byers Independent School District to from Petrolia Independent School District on May 25, 2012)
 Pewitt Independent School District (consolidated with Marietta Independent School District to form Pewitt Consolidated Independent School District on September 1, 2008)
 Phillips Independent School District (consolidated with Plemons Independent School District and Stinnet Independent School District and renamed Plemons-Stinnet-Phillips Independent School District on July 1, 1987)
 Pineland Independent School District (merged with Bronson ISD to form the West Sabine Independent School District)
 Pleasant Grove Independent School District (Dallas County, became a part of the Dallas Independent School District)
 Plemons Independent School District (consolidated with Phillips Independent School District and Stinnet Independent School District and renamed Plemons-Stinnet-Phillips Independent School District on July 1, 1987)
 Port Neches Independent School District (renamed Port Neches-Groves Independent School District on July 1, 1991)
 Pottsville Independent School District (annexed to Hamilton Independent School District on July 1, 1989)
 Rochester County Line Independent School District (consolidated with Haskell Consolidated Independent School District on July 1, 2005)
 Roscoe Independent School District (changed name to Roscoe Collegiate Independent School District on October 22, 2012)
 Rosen Heights Independent School District (renamed Lake Worth Independent School District in 1959)
 Roxton Independent School District (consolidated with Chisum Independent School District on July 1, 2019)
 Samnorwood Independent School District (annexed to Wellington Independent School District on July 2, 2012)
 Santa Cruz Independent School District (annexed to London Independent School District on July 1, 1991)
 Star Independent School District (consolidated with Goldthwaite Independent School District on July 1, 2014)
 Seagoville Independent School District (became a part of the Dallas Independent School District)
 Smiley Independent School District (consolidated with Nixon-Smiley Consolidated Independent School District on September 1, 1983)
 South Park Independent School District (consolidated with Beaumont Independent School District on July 1, 1984)
 South Plains Independent School District (annexed to Floydada Independent School District on July 1, 1988)
 Spade Independent School District (consolidated with Olton Independent School District on July 1, 2006)
 Stinnet Independent School District (consolidated with Phillips Independent School District and Plemons Independent School District and renamed Plemons-Stinnet-Phillips Independent School District on July 1, 1987)
 Sugar Land Independent School District (merged with Missouri City ISD into Fort Bend Independent School District)
 Talpa Independent School District (consolidated with Mozelle Independent School District and renamed Panther Creek Independent School District on July 1, 1986)
 Three Way Independent School District (Bailey County) (consolidated with Sudan Independent School District on July 1, 2002)
 Three Way Independent School District (Erath County) (reclassified as an independent school district on July 1, 1988)
 Waka Independent School District (consolidated with Perryton Independent School District on September 9, 1990)
 Weinert Independent School District (consolidated with Haskell Independent School District on July 1, 1990)
 Wellman Independent School District (consolidated with Union Independent School District to form Wellman-Union Consolidated Independent School District on July 1, 1997)
 West Lamar Independent School District (consolidated with Delmar Independent School District to form Delmar-West Lamar Consolidated Independent School District on July 1, 1985)
 Westminster Independent School District (annexed to Anna Independent School District on July 1, 1989)
 White Oak Independent School District (split between Aldine ISD and Houston ISD in 1937; not to be confused with the existing White Oak Independent School District in North Texas)
 Wilmer-Hutchins Independent School District (annexed to Dallas Independent School District on July 1, 2006)
 Windom Independent School District (consolidated with Honey Grove Independent School District and renamed Honey Grove Consolidated Independent School District on July 1, 1987)
 Winfield Independent School District (annexed to Mount Pleasant Independent School District on July 1, 2018)
 Wingate Independent School District (annexed to Winters Independent School District on July 1, 1991)

See also

List of high schools in Texas
Texas Education Agency

References

Further reading
 Map of Texas school districts for 2018-2019 - Post at the Houston Independent School District
  - Shapefile from Stanford University
  - Shapefile from Stanford University

 
School districts
Texas
School districts